Jacqueline Y. Collins is an American politician serving as a Democratic member of the Illinois Senate, representing the 16th district since 2003.

Early life and education
Born in McComb, Mississippi, Collins earned her undergraduate degree in journalism from Northwestern University. She then worked for the Citizen Community Newspaper and CBS-TV news.

Collins returned to school when she pursued two concurrent degrees from Harvard University. In June 2001, she received her master's degree in public administration from Harvard Kennedy School. Two years later, she earned her master's degree in theological studies from Harvard’s Divinity School.

Career
Collins worked on the massive voter registration drive that helped elect Harold Washington. In 1984, Collins served as a press liaison for the Reverend Jesse Jackson during the Democratic National Convention and as a press secretary to Congressman Gus Savage.

From 1987 to 1999, Collins volunteered as Minister of Communications for St. Sabina Catholic Church. During this time, the church launched a large scale public awareness campaign against alcohol and tobacco companies, and advertising agencies that targeted inner city neighborhoods. As a result of this campaign, the Chicago City Council passed an ordinance banning alcohol and tobacco billboards in the city.

In the summer of 2001, Collins worked as a Legislative Fellow for Senator Hillary Clinton in Washington, D.C.

Illinois Senate 
Collins was elected to the Illinois Senate in 2002. She highlights her work to extend limitations for civil and criminal prosecution of sex crimes against children; legislation allowing more Illinois senior citizens to qualify for the Homestead Exemption based on the number of days they lived at their residence; and a resolution creating a 17-member commission to study and document racial and gender discrimination in hiring or contracting on state public construction projects.

Collins authored and sponsored legislation, passed by the state government, that would prohibit Illinois state investment in companies doing business in the Republic of the Sudan. The legislation was the first of its kind in the United States, and has been used as a model for six similar bills.

Collins was a member of the Governor’s Racial Profiling Task Force and the Governor’s Statewide Community Safety Re-entry commission which deals with reducing recidivism amongst individuals recently paroled from Illinois correctional facilities.

As of July 2022, Collins was a member of the following Illinois Senate committee:

 Appropriations - Government Infrastructure (SAPP-SAGI)
 Appropriations - Judiciary Committee (SAPP-SAJU)
 (Chairwoman of) Criminal Law Committee (SCCL)
 Financial Institutions Committee (SFIC)
 Redistricting - Chicago South Committee (SRED-SRCS)
 Transportation Committee (STRN)

Collins consistently votes against gaming legislation.

Collins served as a delegate to the 2012 Democratic National Convention.

Personal life 
Collins is Catholic and received an endorsement for her 2022 campaign for Congress from her pastor, Father Michael Pfleger.

References

External links
Biography, bills and committees at the 98th Illinois General Assembly
By session: 98th, 97th, 96th, 95th, 94th, 93rd
 State Senator Jacqueline Collins constituency site
 Jacqueline Collins for State Senator
 
 Senator Jacqueline Y. Collins at Illinois Senate Democrats

1949 births
21st-century American politicians
21st-century American women politicians
African-American Catholics
Candidates in the 2022 United States House of Representatives elections
Harvard Divinity School alumni
Harvard Kennedy School alumni
Democratic Party Illinois state senators
Living people
Medill School of Journalism alumni
People from McComb, Mississippi
Women state legislators in Illinois